This is a partial list of major banking company mergers in the United States.

Table

Mergers chart 

This 2012 chart shows some of the mergers noted above. Solid arrows point from the acquiring bank to the acquired one. The lines are labeled with the year of the deal and color-coded from blue (older) to red (newer). Dotted arrows point to the final merged entity.

References

Citations 
 Stephen A. Rhoades, "Bank Mergers and Industrywide Structure, 1980–1994," Washington: Board of Governors of the Federal Reanuary 1996. (Staff study 169)
 Steven J. Pilloff, "Bank Merger Activity in the United States, 1994–2003," Washington: Board of Governors of the Federal Reserve System, May 2004.  (Staff study 176)
Institute of Mergers, Acquisitions and Alliances (MANDA) M&A An academic research institute on mergers & acquisitions, including bank mergers
Mellon Merger, The New York Times, April 7, 1983

Corporation-related lists
Mergers
Lists of corporate mergers and acquisitions
Lists of companies of the United States by industry
Banking-related lists